Dame Mary Colette Bowe  (born 1946) is an English entrepreneur and former civil servant.

Born in Liverpool, Bowe has a Ph.D. in economics from Queen Mary University of London. In her executive career, she was in the UK civil service from 1975 to 1987. She was involved in the Westland affair as she was ordered by her boss, Leon Brittan, the Secretary of State for Trade and Industry, to leak a letter highly damaging to Michael Heseltine. As she was the chief information officer at the Department of Trade and Industry, it led to Brittan's resignation from the cabinet as well. In an interview given to Charles Moore for his authorised biography of Margaret Thatcher, Bowe ended her long-standing refusal to discuss the issue has not said before who had ordered the leak.

She was chairman of Ofcom from 2009 to 2014, chairman of Electra Private Equity plc from 2010 to 2014 and chairman of the Council of Queen Mary University of London from 2004 to 2009. She has also served on the boards of Thames Water Utilities, London and Continental Railways, Axa IM, Morgan Stanley and the Yorkshire Building Society. She founded and was first chairman of the Telecoms Ombudsman Service (now Ombudsman Services) in 2002–2003. She was the first chairman of the Ofcom Consumer Panel (2003–2008), and has worked as the executive chairman of the distribution arm of Fleming Asset Management.

Bowe is the chairman of the Banking Standards Board and the Associated Board of the Royal Schools of Music, the president of the Voice of the Listener & Viewer, a trustee of The Tablet and the Nuffield Foundation, and is also a visiting fellow of Nuffield College. She is also a board member of the UK Statistics Authority and a non-executive director of the Department for Transport.

Honours
She was made a Dame Commander of the Order of the British Empire in the New Year honours 2014 for services to media and communications.

References

1946 births
Living people
Alumni of the London School of Economics
Civil servants in the Department of Trade and Industry
English people of Irish descent
English Roman Catholics
Dames Commander of the Order of the British Empire
Fellows of Nuffield College, Oxford
Place of birth missing (living people)